Edmund Cooper Manfred (5 June 1856 – 20 February 1941) often referred as E.C. Manfred was an English born Australian architect who was prominent for his works for designing well known and iconic buildings in Goulburn, New South Wales.

Early life
Manfred was born on 5 June 1856 in Kensington, London. He was the only child of Mr. Edward Manfred, who was an architect and surveyor. By 1870, Manfred and his widowed mother sailed to join their family in Sydney who had already settled in Manly. Manfred completed his education and undertook training as an architect.

Work
Manfred was a qualified architect who designed most iconic buildings and parks in Goulburn, including the town hall, the Goulburn Hospital, Belmore Park, and the St. John's Orphanage. As well as that, Manfred was a member of the Royal Society of New South Wales and the Royal Historical Society of New South Wales.

Death
Manfred died on 20 February 1941 at the age of 84. He was survived by six sons, three who had  predeceased him. By the time of his death, he played a prominent role in the civic and business life of Goulburn for more than 60 years. A plaque was erected in the St Saviour's Cathedral to commemorate him, as he was associated with the building. The State Library of New South Wales opened a collection of Manfred's works in 2013, with the first exhibitions opened on 24 February.

Gallery
Below are some photographs of some notable works by Manfred:

References

1856 births
1941 deaths
People from Kensington
New South Wales architects
English emigrants to Australia